Communist Workers' Party of Catalonia is a communist party in Catalonia. The party was founded in 1973 as a split from Partit Socialista Unificat de Catalunya as the Catalan branch of the Spanish Communist Workers' Party (PCOE), and was legalized on 28 October 1977. In 2000, it became a part of the Communist Party of the Peoples of Spain.

The central organ of PCOC was Endavant!, which was published monthly 1974-1999. The party's general secretary was Albert Farrán.

History
Election results:
1980 Parliament of Catalonia elections: 12,963 votes (0.48%)
1984 Parliament of Catalonia elections: 2,593 votes (0.09%)

When Enrique Líster rejoined the Communist Party of Spain (PCE) in 1986, following the departure of Santiago Carrillo from PCE, major sections of PCOC returned to PSUC. PCOC fused, along with PCOE, into the Communist Party of the Peoples of Spain in 2000.

References

 Isidre Molas (editor), Joan B. Culla i Clarà Diccionari dels partits polítics de Catalunya: segle XX, Diccionaris de l'Enciclopèdia, Barcelona, Enciclopèdia Catalana, 2000, pagines 189 & 225,

External links
 Official Twitter
 Official Facebook

Communist parties in Catalonia
Political parties established in 1973
1973 establishments in Spain